Gary Anthony Wayne (born November 30, 1962) is an American former Major League Baseball left-handed pitcher. He played for the Minnesota Twins, Colorado Rockies, and Los Angeles Dodgers between 1989 and 1994.

Early life
Wayne graduated from Crestwood High School in 1980.  He is an alumnus of the University of Michigan. In 1983, he played collegiate summer baseball in the Cape Cod Baseball League for the Yarmouth-Dennis Red Sox.

Career
Drafted by the Montreal Expos in the 4th round of the 1984 MLB amateur draft, Wayne would make his Major League Baseball debut with the Minnesota Twins on April 7, and appeared in his final game on June 3, .

References

External links
, or Retrosheet, or Pura Pelota (Venezuelan Winter League)

1962 births
Living people
Acereros de Monclova players
Albuquerque Dukes players
American expatriate baseball players in Mexico
Baseball players from Michigan
Colorado Rockies players
Diablos Rojos del México players
Indianapolis Indians players
Jacksonville Expos players
Los Angeles Dodgers players
Major League Baseball pitchers
Mexican League baseball pitchers
Michigan Wolverines baseball players
Minnesota Twins players
Navegantes del Magallanes players
American expatriate baseball players in Venezuela
People from Dearborn, Michigan
Portland Beavers players
West Palm Beach Expos players
Yarmouth–Dennis Red Sox players